From Afar is a 2015 Venezuelan drama film directed by Lorenzo Vigas and written by Vigas and Guillermo Arriaga. It won the Golden Lion at the 72nd Venice International Film Festival. It was selected as the Venezuelan entry for the Best Foreign Language Film at the 89th Academy Awards but it was not nominated.

The film is about Armando, a wealthy middle-aged man who gets involved with Élder, a young man from a street gang.

Cast
 Alfredo Castro as Armando
 Luis Silva as Élder
 Jericó Montilla as Amelia
 Catherina Cardozo as María
 Jorge Luis Bosque as Fernando
 Greymer Acosta as Palma
 Auffer Camacho as Mermelada

Accolades

See also
 List of lesbian, gay, bisexual or transgender-related films of 2015
 List of submissions to the 89th Academy Awards for Best Foreign Language Film
 List of Venezuelan submissions for the Academy Award for Best Foreign Language Film

References

External links
 
 
 

2015 films
2015 drama films
2015 LGBT-related films
2015 directorial debut films
Gay-related films
Venezuelan drama films
Venezuelan LGBT-related films
2010s Spanish-language films
Films set in Venezuela
LGBT-related drama films
Golden Lion winners